Shahrak-e Seyyed Enayat (also Romanized as Shahrak-e Seyyed ‘Enāyat) is a village in Choghamish Rural District, Choghamish District, Dezful County, Khuzestan Province, Iran. At the 2006 census, its population was 626, in 122 families.

References 

Populated places in Dezful County